The Oxymonads  (or Oxymonadida) are a group of flagellated protozoa found exclusively in the intestines of termites and other wood-eating insects. Along with the similar parabasalid flagellates, they harbor the symbiotic bacteria that are responsible for breaking down cellulose.

It includes Dinenympha, Pyrsonympha, and Oxymonas.

Characteristics
Most Oxymonads are around 50 μm in size and have a single nucleus, associated with four flagella. Their basal bodies give rise to several long sheets of microtubules, which form an organelle called an axostyle, but different in structure from the axostyles of parabasalids.  The cell may use the axostyle to swim, as the sheets slide past one another and cause it to undulate.  An associated fiber called the preaxostyle separates the flagella into two pairs.  A few oxymonads have multiple nuclei, flagella, and axostyles.

Relationship to Trimastix
The free-living flagellate Trimastix is closely related to the oxymonads. It lacks mitochondria and has four flagella separated by a preaxostyle, but unlike the oxymonads has a feeding groove. This character places the Oxymonads and Trimastix among the Excavata, and in particular they may belong to the metamonads.

Taxonomy
 Order Oxymonadida Grassé 1952 emend. Cavalier-Smith 2003
 Family Oxymonadidae Kirby 1928 [Oxymonadaceae]
 Genus ?Barroella Zeliff 1944 [Kirbyella Zeliff 1930 non Kirkaldy 1906 non Bolivar 1909]
 Genus ?Metasaccinobaculus Freitas 1945
 Genus ?Tubulimonoides Krishnamurthy & Sultana 1976
 Genus Microrhopalodina Grassé & Foa 1911 [Proboscidiella Kofoid & Swezy 1926; Opisthomitus Grassé 1952 non Duboscq & Grassé 1934]
 Genus Oxymonas Janicki 1915
 Genus Sauromonas Grassé & Hollande 1952
 Family Polymastigidae Bütschli 1884 [Polymastigaceae]
 Genus ?Brachymonas Grassé 1952 non Hiraishi et al. 1995
 Genus ?Paranotila Cleveland 1966
 Genus Monocercomonoides Travis 1932
 Genus Polymastix Bütschli 1884 non Gruber 1884
 Family Pyrsonymphidae Grassé 1892 [Pyrsonymphaceae; Dinenymphaceae]
 Genus Dinenympha Leidy 1877
 Genus Pyrsonympha Leidy 1877 [Pyrsonema Kent 1881; Lophophora Comes 1910 non Coulter 1894 non Kraatz 1895 non Moeschler 1890]
 Family Saccinobaculidae Brugerolle & Lee 2002 ex Cavalier-Smith 2012
 Genus Notila Cleveland 1950
 Genus Saccinobaculus Cleveland-Hall & Sanders & Collier 1934
 Family Streblomastigidae Kofoid & Swezy 1919 [Streblomastigaceae]
 Genus Streblomastix Kofoid & Swezy 1920

References 

Flagellates
Metamonads